The Chief of the General Staff of the Armed Forces of the Pridnestrovskaia Moldavskaia Respublika is the highest-ranking military officer of the Armed Forces of Transnistria. He is responsible for the administration and the operational control of the Transnistria military. The current Chief of the General Staff is Major General .

List of Commanders

References

Military of Transnistria
Transnistria
1993 establishments in Moldova